The 2015 Blossom Cup is a professional tennis tournament played on outdoor hard courts. It is the seventh edition of the tournament which is part of the 2015 ITF Women's Circuit, offering a total of $50,000 in prize money. It takes place in Quanzhou, China, on 23–29 March 2015.

Women's singles entrants

Seeds 

 1 Rankings as of 9 March 2015

Other entrants 
The following players received wildcards into the singles main draw:
  Liang Chen
  Liu Chang
  Zhang Yuxuan
  Zhao Di

The following players received entry from the qualifying draw:
  Hsu Chieh-yu
  Dalila Jakupović
  Ayumi Morita
  Jil Teichmann

The following player received entry by a junior exempt:
  Xu Shilin

Champions

Singles 

  Elizaveta Kulichkova def.  Jeļena Ostapenko, 6–1, 5–7, 7–5

Doubles 

  Eri Hozumi /  Makoto Ninomiya def.  Hiroko Kuwata /  Junri Namigata, 6–3, 6–7(2–7), [10–2]

External links 
 2015 Blossom Cup at ITFtennis.com

2015 ITF Women's Circuit
2015 in Chinese tennis
Industrial Bank Cup